The Sainte-Anne Ouest River is a tributary of the Bras du Nord flowing in the unorganized territory of Lac-Blanc and Lac-Croche, as well as in the town of Saint-Raymond, in the MRC Portneuf Regional County Municipality, in the administrative region of Capitale-Nationale, in Quebec, in Canada.

The Sainte-Anne Ouest river is mainly served by the forest road R0320 and the rang Saguenay road which passes on the east bank of the Neilson river and the Bras du Nord.

The main economic activities in the sector are forestry and recreational tourism activities.

The surface of the Sainte-Anne Ouest river (except the rapids) is generally frozen from the beginning of December to the end of March; however, safe circulation on the ice is generally from late December to early March.

Geography 
The Sainte-Anne Ouest river rises at the mouth of Lake Annette (altitude ). This lake is located on the southern slope of the watershed boundary with Batiscan Lake (Quebec). Its mouth is located at:
 south of Batiscan Lake (Quebec);
 northwest of the confluence of the Sainte-Anne Ouest river and the Neilson River;
 north of the confluence of the Bras du Nord and the Sainte-Anne River.

The course of the Sainte-Anne Ouest river descends in the following segments:

Upper course of the Sainte-Anne Ouest river (segment of )
  towards the south-east crossing Lake Querré, then Lake Fairchild (altitude ) on ) to its mouth;
  to the east, in particular by crossing the Lac Le Gardeur (altitude ) over its full length to its mouth;
  to the south in a deep valley, notably crossing an unidentified lake (altitude ) on its full length, up to the outlet (coming from the east) of a set of lakes including Lac Nollet;
  westward curving southwards, to the outlet of Cunningham Lake (coming from the northwest);
  towards the south in particular by crossing Pinsart Lake (altitude ), then branching towards west, to the outlet (coming from the northwest) of a set of lakes including Nessa, aux Bleuets, Gorren and Insipide;

Lower course of the Sainte-Anne Ouest river (segment of )
  towards the south-east by crossing some rapids until the discharge (coming from the east) of two unidentified lakes;
  towards the west by forming a curve towards the north to go around a mountain, up to a bend of the river, corresponding to the discharge (coming from the northwest) of a set of lakes;
  in a deep valley, first towards the south-east and bifurcating towards the south, up to the stream of Crapaud (coming from the north-east);
  to the south in a deep valley and crossing some rapids, until the Red stream (coming from the west);
  in a deep valley crossing some rapids, first towards the east by collecting the discharge (coming from the south) from an unidentified lake, bending towards the south-east by collecting the discharge (coming from the southwest) of a group of lakes, and bypassing an island at the end of the segment, to its mouth.

The Sainte-Anne Ouest river flows at the confluence of the Neilson River; this confluence becomes the source of the Bras du Nord. From there, the current generally descends south following the course of the latter to the northwest bank of the Sainte-Anne River. From this last confluence, the current descends on  generally towards the south and the southwest by following the course of the Sainte-Anne river, until the northwest bank of St. Lawrence River.

Toponymy 
The toponym "Rivière Sainte-Anne Ouest" was formalized on December 5, 1968, at the Place Names Bank of the Commission de toponymie du Québec.

See also 

 List of rivers of Quebec

References

Bibliography

External links 
 

Rivers of Capitale-Nationale